Harristown is a residential locality in Toowoomba in the Toowoomba Region, Queensland, Australia.

Geography
Harristown is located to the southwest of the Toowoomba city centre.

History 
The locality is named after George Harris (1831–1891), a Brisbane businessman and Member of the Queensland Legislative Council.

Originally in the Shire of Drayton, the locality was first opened as the Harristown Estate in 1902. Forty blocks were sold at the auction.

Harristown State School  opened on 4 September 1911 with 67 students. The official opening on Saturday 30 September 1911 was performed by the acting Secretary for Education Kenneth Grant, by which time the enrolment had already increased to 84 students.

From 1915 until 1993, the suburb had a functioning railway station on the Toowoomba–Wyreema line.

After World War II, the area boomed.

Although the need for Lutheran schooling in Toowoomba had been identified since 1926, the Great Depression followed by World War II prevented a school being established. Concordia Lutheran College opened on 17 February 1946 in the (now heritage-listed) house Redlands on a  site in Stephens Street with 27 students (23 of them being boarders). In 1964 a primary school campus opened nearby in Warwick Street with an initial 64 students. A second primary school campus (originally called Martin Luther Primary School) was established in 1977 in Hume Street, Centenary Heights.

St Anthony's Catholic Primary School was established in 1954 by the Presentation Sisters. The foundation stone was laid on 21 November 1954, which is a significant day for the sisters as their order celebrates the Feast of the Presentation of Mary in the Temple on 21 November each year. The first classroom was ready in February 1955 and by the end of 1955 there were 116 students enrolled. The Presentation Sisters ran the school until the first lay principal was appointed in 1985, although the sisters continued to teach in the school until the end of 1997.

Harristown State High School opened on 24 January 1955.

Heritage listings
Harristown has a number of heritage-listed sites, including:
 8 Panda  Street: Smithfield House
 corner of South Street and Anzac Avenue: Drayton and Toowoomba Cemetery
 341-367 South Street: Harristown State High School Buildings
 154 Stephen Street: Redlands

Education
Harristown State School is a government primary (Prep-6) school for boys and girls at 332 South Street. In 2017, the school had an enrolment of 397 students with 34 teachers (28 full-time equivalent) and 32 non-teaching staff (21 full-time equivalent). It includes a special education program.

Harristown State High School is a government secondary (7-12) school for boys and girls at 341-367 South Street. In 2017, the school had an enrolment of 1,661 students with 142 teachers (130 full-time equivalent) and 57 non-teaching staff (46 full-time equivalent). It includes a special education program and an Intensive English program.

St Anthony's School is a Catholic primary (Prep-6) school for boys and girls at 9 Memory Street. In 2017, the school had an enrolment of 244 students with 18 teachers (14 full-time equivalent) and 11 non-teaching staff (7 full-time equivalent).

Concordia Lutheran College is a private primary (Prep-6) campus of Concordia Lutheran College for boys and girls at 67 Warwick Street. In 2017, the school had an enrolment of 644 students with 68 teachers (48 full-time equivalent) and 75 non-teaching staff (45 full-time equivalent).

Concordia Lutheran College is a private secondary (7-12) school for boys and girls at 154 Stephen Street. In 2017, the school had an enrolment of 644 students with 68 teachers (48 full-time equivalent) and 75 non-teaching staff (45 full-time equivalent).

Features
 Drayton and Toowoomba Cemetery
 Milne Bay Museum
 Elders and Landmark Saleyards

References

External links

 
 Suburb Profile: Harristown
 Australian Dictionary of Biography - Harris, George (1831–1891)

 
Suburbs of Toowoomba
Localities in Queensland